The siege of Caesarea relates to the siege and conquest of Caesarea Maritima of the Byzantine Empire's Palaestina Prima province by the Sasanian Persians in 614 CE.

History
The Persian Shah Khosrau II appointed his general Shahrbaraz to conquer the Byzantine controlled areas of the Near East. Following the victory in Antioch, Shahrbaraz conquered Caesarea Maritima, the administrative capital of the province. By this time the grand inner harbor had silted up and was useless, however the Emperor Anastasius had reconstructed the outer harbor and Caesarea remained an important maritime city, providing the Persian Empire with access to the Mediterranean Sea. While the Persian siege and occupation of Caesarea resulted in limited physical destruction, the socioeconomic effects were likely more significant. The later Arab conquest also devastated the city and it subsequently entered a period of decline.

See also
Samaritan Revolts, 484–572 CE
List of conflicts in the Near East

References

Sources

Caesarea Maritima
Caesarea Maritima
610s in the Byzantine Empire
Caesarea Maritima
Holy Land during Byzantine rule
Caesarea
614
610s in the Sasanian Empire
Caesarea Maritima